Operational Command East (OC East) is a formation of the Ukrainian Ground Forces in eastern Ukraine. Its headquarters is currently located in Dnipro.

History
When Ukraine gained independence from the Soviet Union in 1991, there were three Soviet military districts in its territory. These were the Kiev Military District, the Odesa Military District, and the Carpathian Military District. In January 1998, the Southern Operational Command was created from the Odessa MD and the eastern part of the Kiev MD. In 2005, the Southern Operational Association was created from the Southern Operational Command. In October 2013, Operational Command South was created from the Southern Operational Association. In January 2015, Operational Command East was established with control over forces in Donetsk, Luhansk, Kharkiv, Dnipropetrovsk, and Zaporizhzhia oblasts. These areas were previously controlled by Operation Command South. The command at the time was led by Lieutenant General Serhiy Nayev. Units under the operational control of OC East were involved in the War in Donbass.

Since the 2022 Russian invasion of Ukraine, units of OC East have been involved in heavy fighting with Russian forces during the Battle of Donbas.

Current structure
Operational Command East has operational command of ground force units in Donetsk, Luhansk, Dnipropetrovsk, Zaporizhzhia, and Kharkiv oblasts.

 Operational Command East, Dnipro
  3rd Tank Brigade, Yarmolyntsi, Khmelnytsky Oblast
  17th Tank Brigade, Kryvyi Rih, Dnipropetrovsk Oblast
  53rd Mechanized Brigade, Sievierodonetsk, Luhansk Oblast
  54th Mechanized Brigade, Bakhmut, Donetsk Oblast
  55th Artillery Brigade, Zaporizhzhia, Zaporizhzhia Oblast
  92nd Mechanized Brigade, Kluhyno-Bashkyrivka, Kharkiv Oblast
  93rd Mechanized Brigade, Cherkaske, Dnipropetrovsk Oblast

See also
 Kharkov Military District

References

External links

Military units and formations of Ukraine
Military units and formations established in 2015
East
2015 establishments in Ukraine